Amanda Farrugia (born 24 January 1985) is a former Australian rules footballer who played for the Greater Western Sydney Giants in the AFL Women's competition. She was the club's inaugural AFLW captain and played in all 21 possible matches across her three seasons at the club.

Early life and state league football
Farrugia was born and raised in the western suburbs of Sydney in New South Wales. Her parents are of Maltese descent and she attended Our Lady Queen of Peace Primary School, Greystanes. She began playing football in 2011 when she joined Macquarie University in the lower divisions of the Sydney Women's AFL (SWAFL). She missed the 2012 season while completing recovery for a knee reconstruction after sustaining a pre-season injury. In 2013, she won the league's division two best and fairest award, as well as the division 2 premiership with Macquarie University & was also named Best on Ground in the Grand Final.  Farrugia was also awarded 'Best Athlete' at the 2013 Macquarie University Sporting Awards. In 2015, she became captain of the club's division one side, a role she continued into the 2016. She was awarded the Mostyn Medal as the SWAFL's best and fairest player in the 2015 season. She finished second in the 2016 award, behind Sydney University's, Nicola Barr.

Upon completion of the 2017 AFLW season, Farrugia once again returned to captain Macquarie University who finished the 2017 season in 3rd place.  Farrugia's brilliant form was once again rewarded with her second Mostyn Medal, as best & fairest player for the Sydney Women's premier division.  Nicola Barr polled highly once again to finish runner-up.

In 2016, Farrugia played exhibition series matches for 's representative team. She went on to join the  side in the year's women's all star match in September 2016.

AFL Women's career
Farrugia was drafted by the Greater Western Sydney Giants with the club's eight pick and sixty-fourth overall in the 2016 AFL Women's draft. She was named the club's inaugural AFL Women's captain in January 2017.

Greater Western Sydney signed Farrugia for the 2018 season during the trade period in May 2017.

In November 2019, Farrugia announced her retirement from the game.

Statistics

|- style="background-color: #EAEAEA"
! scope="row" style="text-align:center" | 2017
|
| 18 || 7 || 0 || 0 || 49 || 14 || 63 || 14 || 27 || 0.0 || 0.0 || 7.0 || 2.0 || 9.0 || 2.0 || 3.9
|- 
! scope="row" style="text-align:center" | 2018
|style="text-align:center;"|
| 18 || 7 || 2 || 1 || 60 || 29 || 89 || 13 || 36 || 0.3 || 0.1 || 8.6 || 4.1 || 12.7 || 1.9 || 5.1
|- style="background-color: #eaeaea"
! scope="row" style="text-align:center" | 2019
|style="text-align:center;"|
| 18 || 7 || 0 || 0 || 33 || 26 || 59 || 11 || 16 || 0.0 || 0.0 || 4.7 || 3.7 || 8.4 || 1.6 || 2.3
|- class="sortbottom"
! colspan=3| Career
! 21
! 2
! 1
! 142
! 69
! 211
! 38
! 79
! 0.1
! 0.0
! 6.8
! 3.3
! 10.0
! 1.8
! 3.8
|}

Personal life
Off-field, Farrugia works as a physical education teacher at Our Lady of Mercy College in Parramatta. She lives in the western Sydney suburb of Seven Hills.

Her husband Daniel Repeti is a high school teacher at Wyndham College in Quakers Hill and a professional photographer. They married in 2015 and have two dogs, George and Sasha.

References

External links 

Living people
1985 births
Greater Western Sydney Giants (AFLW) players
Australian people of Maltese descent
Sportswomen from New South Wales
Australian rules footballers from Sydney
Australian schoolteachers